Live Audio Wrestling (also known as The LAW) was a Canadian sports radio talk show hosted by "The Mouth" Dan Lovranski and Jason Agnew. The program primarily covered news and events surrounding professional wrestling (such as WWE) and mixed martial arts. First premiering in May 1997 as an internet radio show, The LAW later shifted to conventional radio on several stations in the Toronto area, and moved to CHUM in 2011, where it remained until its cancellation on October 30, 2017.

A new video podcast series, also called Live Audio Wrestling, is set to air as part of Impact Wrestling's Twitch platform. Most of the shows making up the original Live Audio Wrestling have since migrated to a new website, known as "Post Wrestling".

History

Live Audio Wrestling started on May 23, 1997, as an internet radio show through Virtually Canadian. The first guest of The LAW was Faarooq. The show aired online for a year and a half before moving to CJCL, The Fan 590however, it was still only broadcast online, since the show was broadcast as replacement programming due to NBA policies prohibiting the station's online feed from airing Toronto Raptors games. In an effort to obtain studio time, the show would be taped early in the morning. Due to popular demand and viewer support, The LAW soon became part of The Fans normal lineup, airing in the early afternoon on Saturdays. The show later expanded to include a two-hour late-night program on Sunday nights from 1:00 to 3:00 a.m., later moved to Saturdays at 11:00 p.m. in late 1999, while the afternoon edition moved to 5:00 p.m. In February 1999, Dave Meltzer of the Wrestling Observer Newsletter began a weekly segment during the program.

Move to CFYI
The LAW aired on The Fan 590 until September 2000 when it moved to rival station CFYI Talk 640 as a companion to the station's recently acquired radio broadcasts of Toronto Maple Leafs games. The evening broadcast was moved from Saturdays to Sundays. In April 2001, the afternoon edition of The LAW was dropped during the station's re-launch under the Mojo Radio format, while The LAW remained on the station through 2006

In January 2005, Fight Network purchased a majority stake in The LAW and in February of that same year they announced that they had secured an agreement with Broadcast News for national distribution the program, via Fight Network Radio.

Fight Network Radio
During the CFYI and CFRB era, The LAW was also syndicated to several other radio stations in Canada through a network known as Fight Network Radio. Former affiliates of the group (aside from its flagship Toronto stations) included:

 CKST - Vancouver 
 CFRN - Edmonton
 CFGO - Ottawa
 CHMJ- Vancouver
 CJOB - Winnipeg

Move to CFRB
In July 2006, The LAW moved to CFRB and retained its 11pm time-slot. In the fall of 2006, Live Audio Wrestling announced that in the future, the show would begin to air a simulcast of the show on Fight Network, however the announcement never came to fruition.

The show is ranked No. 1 in the demographic of male, on talk radio in the Toronto market, in its time slot. In April 2006, The Bureau of Broadcast Measurement released their spring ratings with The LAW ranking No. 1 among Males 25 - 49 on Sunday nights with an 18.7 share and also scoring a 17.8 share among Males 18 – 34.

Live Audio Xtra
Starting in the winter of 2007, John Pollock began to host an extended, online edition of The LAW called Live Audio Xtra. The segment is available to those who listen to the archived edition of the show on The LAW website, as an add-on to the original radio production. Shortly after its launch, Dan Lovranski began to co-host the segment, answering e-mail questions. Starting with the January 20th 2008 edition, Live Audio Xtra began to take call-in questions from listeners who were unable to get on the air during the radio portion of the program. This segment of the show was discontinued for a brief period of time, but returned to The LAW in 2011.

Move to satellite radio, interim podcast
The LAW aired its final edition on CFRB on January 11, 2009, moving to the Sirius Satellite Radio channel Hardcore Sports Radio (later known as The Score Satellite Radio), maintaining its Sunday night timeslot, and still being produced from CFRB's studios. Despite no longer being aired on conventional radio, the program was still billed as being a part of Fight Network Radio. After the closure of The Score Satellite Radio in August 2011, The LAW briefly became a podcast on the Fight Network website, using the same format as the radio versions (but without call-in segments).

Move to CHUM
On October 9, 2011, The LAW moved to CHUM; while the program maintained its traditional 11:00 p.m. timeslot, it is preempted by Sunday Night Football during the NFL season.

The LAW began airing on CHUM's sister station CFTE in Vancouver on September 9, 2012. The LAW currently does not air on any other TSN Radio station.

Cancellation
On the morning of October 30, 2017, the LAW issued a statement:

This announcement came just fourteen hours after the October 29 edition of The LAW was made available for podcasting. Many fans were caught off guard as the hosts had signed off planning for a big show for the next week, including a returning John Pollock reviewing Impact Bound For Glory and UFC 217: Bisping vs. St-Pierre.

It was reported on the Wrestling Observer / Figure Four Online website in Dave Meltzer's October 30 Daily Update that;

On the October 31 edition of Wrestling Observer Radio Meltzer also stated "The amount of money that they're (Anthem) losing on Impact, has led to them doing cuts on the Fight Network" and "All the particulars (Presenters) that were on the show you know, are going to be gone." He went on to speculate that The LAW may be turned into an "Impact promotional show".

Many of the LAW hosts including those from the associated podcasts received overwhelming support from their fans on Twitter, including Jason Agnew, John Pollock, Wai Ting, Braden Herrington, "Bartender" Dave, Brian Mann, and Nate Milton, while Chris Charlton, WH Park, Martian Bushby, and Richard Benson publicly thanked The LAW & John Pollock for their opportunities with "Japanese Audio Wrestling" and "British Audio Wrestling" respectively. Oli Court of "British Audio Wrestling" hinted "it's not the end of anything just yet!" and Jojo Remy of "Japanese Audio Wrestling" stated "Not sure what this means for my show. I’ll continue to be a strong presence at Voices of Wrestling."

Starting with the day after the shutdown of the LAW, John Pollock and Wai Ting continued to post audio reviews of Raw and SmackDown, under the temporary titles of John Pollock and Wai Ting Review Raw and John Pollock and Wai Ting Review SmackDown, respectively. On their first episode as independent podcasters, both hosts (Pollock had been one of Fight Network's longest-tenured employees, and, at the time of their release, one of the few remaining full-time journalists) discussed the news of being released from Fight Network (also stating that Dan "The Mouth" Lovranski and Jason Agnew were released), thanking their fans for all the support they received, their plans for their "future endeavours", alongside the review of Raw.

In January 2018, Impact Wrestling announced that a new show with the Live Audio Wrestling name will air as part of its Twitch channel, as a video podcast hosted by Jeremy Borash, though as of April 2018 it has yet to air, owing to Borash's subsequent departure.  Aside from the name, it has no connection to the original show.

The spiritual successor of Live Audio Wrestling in its original form, titled "POST Wrestling" and run in its entirety by John Pollock and Wai Ting (the name is an abbreviation of "Pollock Offsets Ting"), was announced on December 15, 2017, and launched on December 24, 2017, with their Christmas show that they had been doing from their days on the LAW.  The two temporary podcasts were folded into the Post Wrestling banner, becoming Rewind-a-Raw and Rewind-a-SmackDown, while other LAW podcasts announced their relaunches under the Post Wrestling umbrella.  The spiritual successor to the Live Audio Wrestling radio show, titled Sunday Night's Main Event was announced on April 3, 2018, and set to air the following Sunday, immediately following Wrestlemania 34; aside from their common origins, Post Wrestling and Sunday Night's Main Event are not formally associated with each other.

Show
Former
Segments
 Dave Meltzer's Wrestling Observer Extra: Each week industry insider Dave Meltzer joins the LAW to discuss the latest in pro wrestling and Mixed Martial Arts. 
 Title Bout Trivia: Wrestling themed quiz where the winner receives a T-shirt from "Barber Shop Window" or "Pro Wrestling Tees".
 LAW Interviews: In depth and full-length interviews with wrestling's top stars from the past and present.
 Breaking The LAW: The Host read some fan feedback on the week in wrestling from "lawradio.proboards.com".
 LAW Xtra: Occasionally added on the end of the podcast, it covers smaller pay-per-view reviews (e.g. ROH, NJPW) or may include additional interviews.
 whtsNXTra: Added on the end of the podcast, covers NXT Takeover reviews.

Hosts
Former co-hosts of the show include:
 Dan "The Mouth" Dan Lovranski (Producer: 1998-2000 / Host: 2000–2017)
 Jason Agnew (Producer: 1999-2003 / Host: 2003–2017)
 John Pollock (Editor: 2003-2005 / Producer: 2005–2017)
 Trish Stratus (Host: 1999)
 "Notorious T.I.D." Chris Tidwell (Host: 1997–1999)
 "Big Daddy" Donnie Abreu (Host: 1997–2000)
 "Gentleman" Jeff Marek (Host: 1997–2003)

Former co-hosts of the spinoff series shows include:
 Jason Agnew ("whts NXT": 2013–2017).
 John Pollock ("Review-A-Wai": 2009–2017; "Review-A-Raw": 2010–2017; "Review-A-SmackDown": 2011–2017; "The MMA Report": 2012–2017; "Bauer & Pollock": ?-2017)
 Wai Ting ("Review-A-Wai": 2009–2017; "Review-A-Raw": 2010–2017; "Review-A-SmackDown": 2011–2017)
 Braden Herrington ("whts NXT": 2013–2017).
 "Bartender" Dave ("whts NXT": 2016–2017).
 Brian Mann ("Review-An-Impact"/"Keep It 2000": 2015–2017).
 Nate Milton ("Review-An-Impact"/"Keep It 2000": 2015–2017).
 Jojo Remy ("Japanese Audio Wrestling": 2017-2017).
 WH Park ("Japanese Audio Wrestling": 2012–2017).
 Chris Charlton ("Japanese Audio Wrestling": 2012–2017).
 Martian Bushby ("British Audio Wrestling": 2017-2017).
 Oli Court ("British Audio Wrestling": 2017-2017).
 Richard Benson ("British Audio Wrestling": 2017-2017).
^ List of presenters only until time of hiatus, for full list of former presenters and spinoff series shows see below.

Trivia
Due to the popularity of the show, TSN's Off the Record has had all past and current co-hosts of the radio program, excluding John Pollock, as guest panelists on the program, over the years.

 Spinoff series 
Over the years, there have been several radio shows and podcasts that have complemented the LAW. Since the shutdown of the LAW, these shows were also put on hiatus, with many of them migrating to Post Wrestling upon the latter's launch in December 2017.

 Former 

 Review-A-Raw 
As a spinoff of Review-A-Wai, John Pollock and Wai Ting also review each week's edition of WWE Raw in a separate podcast series. As with Review-A-Wai, each episode John Pollock and Wai Ting run down the previous episode of WWE Raw and end by reading listener feedback. The first episode of Review-A-Raw was posted on July 6, 2010.  For a time in 2011, Review-A-Raw was available as a live podcast, airing over the internet via Stickam immediately following WWE Raw, but it reverted to a taped format over technical issues resulting in one or both hosts being knocked off of the air.

As announced during a live Review-A-Wai podcast held immediately prior to WrestleMania 31, the Review-A-Raw name expanded to also encompass a television series broadcast on Fight Network, with John Pollock and Wai Ting as co-hosts. The televised version of Review-A-Raw is effectively a televised recording session of the podcast, with the actual WWE Raw review content identical in both versions.  However, some segments have been modified to suit the television audience, such as the omission of listener feedback and a shorter banter portion at the start of the show that more directly relates to the co-hosts' positions at Fight Network.  As both the podcast and televised shows are produced in the same sitting, there may be segments omitted from the televised portion; a selection of segments from the podcast version may be, at their discretion, posted to the Fight Network's YouTube page as Review-A-Raw Extra; the first Review-A-Raw Extra segment was dedicated to a contest selecting the televised series' theme music.  As the podcast version takes precedence, the television edition of the show is likely to be pre-empted in the event of other Fight Network commitments by either host; this first occurred on July 5, 2016, where Jason Agnew would host an audio-only edition in lieu of the televised show, due to John and Wai covering UFC 200 for Fight Network.  The final "podcast-only" episode of Review-A-Raw was posted March 31, 2015, with the first episode of the televised series aired on Fight Network on April 7, 2015.

In January 2016, John Pollock and Wai Ting also produced an additional televised segment, Raw in 3 Minutes, co-branded with Fight Network's Fight News Now branding; both the full televised version and Raw in 3 Minutes is available from the Live Audio Wrestling YouTube channel.  In mid-2017, Review-A-Raw was made into a web-only video series alongside Review-a-SmackDown, ending the run of Raw in 3 Minutes.

The last episode of Review-a-Raw was posted on October 23, 2017. Following the shutdown of the LAW a week later, John Pollock and Wai Ting continued to post audio reviews of Raw under the temporary title of John Pollock and Wai Ting Review Raw. The full-time replacement for Review-a-Raw under the Post Wrestling banner, Rewind-a-Raw, launched on December 25, 2017.

 Review-A-SmackDown 
On selected weeks with a live episode of WWE SmackDown, a third LAW podcast starring John Pollock and Wai Ting is also available for download on Wednesdays. Like Review-A-Raw and Review-An-Impact, Review-A-SmackDown reviews the previous episode of WWE SmackDown, ending with listener feedback. The first episode of Review-A-SmackDown was posted on August 31, 2011, with Jason Agnew filling in for Wai Ting; the first episode with Wai Ting was posted on December 1, 2011.  Up until the second WWE brand extension, Review-A-SmackDown would be produced only on a show-by-show basis, and not every live episode of WWE SmackDown would be reviewed.

Review-A-SmackDown would become a weekly podcast with the second WWE brand extension, complementing Review-A-Raw.  Unlike Review-A-Raw, however, Review-A-SmackDown is intended to remain an audio-only podcast, and not a show that is meant to air on Fight Network.  The first regular episode of Review-A-SmackDown was posted on July 19, 2016, covering the WWE draft that kicked off the second WWE brand extension.

For a brief time in 2017, Review-a-Smackdown was also made available as a web video, under the same format as Review-a-Raw.  The last episode of Review-a-Smackdown was posted on October 25, 2017.  Following the shutdown of the LAW later that week, John Pollock and Wai Ting continued to post audio reviews of SmackDown under the temporary title of John Pollock and Wai Ting Review SmackDown.  The full-time replacement of Review-a-SmackDown, under the Post Wrestling banner, Rewind-a-SmackDown, launched on December 27, 2017.

 whtsNXT whtsNXT (pronounced as "what's next") is a podcast hosted by Jason Agnew and technical producer Braden Herrington, focusing on NXT, while incorporating elements from Bite Network Radio.  The name was chosen to not only reflect the product being reviewed (a show based on developmental wrestling), but also the fact that this was Braden's first foray into radio broadcasting (having joined shortly after the LAW debuted on TSN Radio as one of his first industry jobs), and a turning point in Agnew's television career (having left Bite TV since the LAW debuted on TSN Radio, leaving him with no permanent work in television aside from Splatalot).  It is seen as continuing in the "rite of passage" of LAW hosts moving up the ranks (Dan Lovranski, Jason Agnew, John Pollock, and Wai Ting were all, at one point, technical producers on The LAW), with the veteran Agnew guiding the rookie Braden, akin to NXT itself.  The first episode was posted on October 7, 2013 as an addition to the LAW's podcast, but thereafter was separately posted on Thursdays thereafter.

"Bartender" Dave debuted on the January 21st 2016 edition of "whtsNXT" alongside Jason Agnew, he has since become a regular guest host on the show. Since Takeover's moved to Saturdays on the same weekend as the WWE's Big 4 events, Takeover reviews have been added onto the end of The LAW podcast under the title of "whtsNXTra". Also since 2017 whtsNXT has chosen to skip the review of the post-Takeover NXT episodes, stating there's no point in reviewing a review show.

The last episode of whtsNXT was posted on October 26, 2017. A spiritual successor under the Post Wrestling banner, titled upNXT and hosted by Braden Herrington and Davie Portman, was launched on March 22, 2018.

 Review-A-Wai "Review-A-Wai" is a weekly review podcast starring John Pollock and Wai Ting, which was originally presented immediately following the archived episode of the LAW and was later made available separately.  The first episode was posted on September 13, 2009.

The two primarily review older wrestling pay-per-view events from the mid to late 1990s, but have since branched out to other media relating to wrestling and mixed martial arts.  Notably, in a homage to an early "Ask-a-Wai" episode where John and Wai reviewed a wrestling-related pornographic film, the second and third anniversary shows had John and Wai review a wrestling-related pornographic film; the visible discomfort of Wai reviewing the film has led them to discontinue reviewing wrestling-related pornographic films.  Reviews of classic events often contain audio clips from the show(s) they are reviewing; at the end of the show, John and Wai also respond to listener feedback after the review.  On occasion, they air relevant clips from previous interviews conducted with various wrestling personalities and/or interview people involved with the event being reviewed, including clips from past "Live Audio Wrestling" shows.  Each episode also ends with a piece of music specifically selected by one of the co-hosts, often relating to the show being reviewed.

On occasion, when either co-host is unavailable, a substitute co-host has joined the other co-host; most notably, Arda Ocal has been a guest reviewer on "Review-A-Wai" on several occasions during the years that the LAW and "Aftermath" (The Score Television Network's wrestling analysis show, co-hosted by Arda Ocal) were promoted together.  Damian Abraham has also been a frequent guest reviewer, especially if the review contains a punk rock element.

The show ceased to be an add-on to the archived episode of the LAW in 2010 when the "Review-A-Wai" portion became as long as the archived episode of the LAW itself. "Review-A-Wai" was moved to a Wednesday release schedule following its second anniversary show, and later to late Tuesdays following the debut of "whtsNXT" so as to avoid multiple LAW podcasts being released on the same day.  With the launch of "Review-A-SmackDown" as a regular weekly series, "Review-A-Wai" became a biweekly series posted on Fridays, alternating with "Bauer & Pollock". Following the end of "Bauler & Pollock", "Review-A-Wai" will continue to be a biweekly series on Fridays alternating with "Keep It 2000".

The final episode of Review-a-Wai was posted on October 19, 2017, with an announced episode that would have aired had the LAW not been shut down.  The first episode of the spiritual successor of Review-a-Wai under the Post Wrestling banner, Rewind-a-Wai, launched with the review intended for the announced episode.

 Japanese Audio Wrestling Japanese Audio Wrestling is a monthly podcast hosted by Chris Charlton and WH Park, both having previously contributed to various LAW-related shows and podcasts, focusing in on Japanese wrestling.  The first episode was posted on August 1, 2012. New host Jojo Remy joined the show on the January 6th, 2017, replacing the leaving pair of Chris Charlton & WH Park. From the 2017 April 3 edition WH Park has made a number of returning guest appearances.

Although put on hiatus with the shutdown of the LAW in October 2017, as part of the launch of Post Wrestling, it was announced that Japanese Audio Wrestling would continue under the Post Wrestling banner with a new name, with no specified timeframe for a relaunch.

 G1 Climax podcastRelated to Japanese Audio Wrestling is the LAW's daily coverage of the G1 Climax tournament each year, with John Pollock recapping most days of the tournament and Chris Charlton and WH Park recapping the remaining days of the tournament.

 The MMA Report with John Pollock The MMA Report with John Pollock is a radio show hosted by John Pollock on TSN Radio, first airing on July 5, 2012. It airs Friday at midnight on TSN Radio (though the show itself is available as a podcast on the LAW podcast feed one day before), and is touted as "the third hour" of the LAW as repeats of the show air immediately after the LAW on weeks without an Ultimate Fighting Championship pay-per-view (when The UFC Post Fight Show airs in its place instead).  As with the LAW, it is also broadcast in the Vancouver market (formerly CFTE and presently CKST) since 2013.

The show is also considered to be a spiritual successor to Fight Network Radio, due to John Pollock's past and present connections.

 Keep It 2000 
In December 2016, Brian Mann and Nate Milton return with a new podcast, Keep It 2000 (billed as "A Podcast On A Pole"). They embark on the worst decision of their lives – fully chronicling every WCW Nitro from the year 2000.  Often considered the worst time period for any major wrestling promotion, these 52 episodes could prove to be the thing that finally breaks these podcasting brothers apart.

The final episode of Keep it 2000 as a LAW podcast was posted on October 14, 2017. As part of the Post Wrestling launch in December 2017, it was announced that Keep it 2000 would continue under the Post Wrestling umbrella; the first episode of Keep it 2000 under the Post Wrestling umbrella was posted on January 25, 2018.

 British Audio Wrestling British Audio Wrestling is a British Wrestling focused podcast launched by Martin Bushby and Oli Court,  with the first episode posted on January 6, 2017. The pair were joined by Richard Benson of The Indy Corner from Episode 2 onwards. The show focuses in on UK promotions "Progress Wrestling", "Revolution Pro Wrestling", "Fight Club: PRO" & "Over The Top Wrestling" and also covers "ITV World of Sport Wrestling" & the "WWE United Kingdom Championship Tournament".

The final episode of British Audio Wrestling was posted on October 17, 2017.  As part of the Post Wrestling launch in December 2017, it was announced that British Audio Wrestling would continue under the Post Wrestling umbrella under a new name, later revealed to be the British Wrestling Experience. The first episode of the British Wrestling Experience launched on January 18, 2018.

 Bauer & Pollock Bauer & Pollock is a co-production between Live Audio Wrestling and Major League Wrestling, where John Pollock and Court Bauer discuss the business of professional wrestling and mixed martial arts. Although initially designed to be a biweekly series, it was moved to a weekly format soon after, available on both the MLW and LAW podcast feeds.  The show was originally posted on Fridays, but was moved to late Wednesdays to avoid having multiple LAW podcasts being posted on the same day.  With the launch of Review-A-SmackDown as a weekly series, Bauer & Pollock became a biweekly series posted on Fridays, alternating with Review-A-Wai. After a lengthy hiatus on 12 January 12, 2017, "The Final Edition" of Bauer & Pollock was uploaded. The reason behind the decision to end Bauer & Pollock was the large workloads of each host and inability to find a common free day to do the podcast. On March 17, 2017, Court & John returned for a "One-Off" special, continuing to do almost one show every month since.

 Ask-A-Wai / Bite Network Radio Ask-A-Wai was an add-on to the end of each LAW broadcast starting in September 2008, and starred John Pollock and Wai Ting, then call screener on the LAW. It was taped immediately following Live Audio Xtra, and was a general discussion podcast and generally unrelated to wrestling.  In late 2009, Jason Agnew joined Ask-A-Wai as a co-host, though retaining the same format as before.

Ask-A-Wai ended with the move of the LAW from CFRB to Hardcore Sports Radio, though the Ask-A-Wai format would be succeeded with the Bite Network Radio podcast.  Bite Network Radio itself would be hosted by Jason Agnew and John Pollock, retaining the format of Ask-A-Wai, and occasionally featuring Wai Ting and other members from their circle of friends.  Like Ask-A-Wai, Bite Network Radio was taped immediately following the LAW.

Bite Network Radio ended with the move of the LAW to TSN Radio, as the studios at TSN could no longer accommodate all of the regular hosts.  Though The Late Shift, a radio show hosted by Jason Agnew on CFRB, is touted as the spiritual successor of Bite Network Radio, it follows a different format and has no formal association to the LAW.

 UFC Post Fight Show on TSN Radio 

Starting in 2011 with UFC 140, The LAW started to present a UFC post fight show on TSN Radio 1050. The show airs after the conclusion of the most recent Ultimate Fighting Championship event and provides results and opinions from callers and MMA journalists.  Though originally branded as a LAW show, since the launch of The MMA Report the show has used the latter show's branding.

 Review-An-Impact 
Each Saturday (some episodes may be delayed to Sunday), former WWE writer Brian Mann and frequent LAW contributor Nate Milton review the previous edition of Impact Wrestling.

Originally hosted by John Pollock and Wai Ting as a counterpart to Review-a-Raw, the first episode of Review-An-Impact was posted on November 5, 2010.  Since September 2011, Nate Milton (nicknamed "The Godfather, TNAte" in the LAW community) has been featured in a recurring segment on Review-An-Impact where he provides separate analysis of the episode; this was often in the form of an interview with one of the co-hosts. In the event that either host was unavailable, Nate takes on the role of co-host for the entire podcast in place of the segment.  In late 2014, due to Wai Ting's other commitments, Nate Milton became a co-host on a more full-time basis, though the arrangement lasted for only a few weeks due to the termination of Impact Wrestling on Spike TV; Wai Ting's final episode of Review-An-Impact was on October 23, 2014.

With the relaunch of Impact Wrestling on Destination America, Review-An-Impact was revamped with Brian Mann as the lead host, initially with John Pollock as co-host in the pilot episode on January 8, 2015, and with Nate Milton as co-host on a full-time basis on the following episode.  Due to being the first "all-American podcast" in the LAW family, and with neither co-host hosting another LAW podcast, Review-An-Impact also expanded their scope to include their commentary on general wrestling news, diversity issues in professional wrestling, pop culture (largely as a result of Brian later joining Yahoo! Movies), and politics in general.

With the declining relevance of TNA in North American professional wrestling in 2015 (and the impending end of the TNA/Destination America partnership), Live Audio Wrestling decided to terminate coverage of TNA following the 2015 Bound for Glory event; the final regular episode of Review-an-Impact (an episode dedicated to counting down the "Top 10 moments in Impact Wrestling history") aired on October 3, 2015.

 Keep It 100 
Billed as "the realest show about being fake", Keep it 100 is a podcast that serves as a spiritual successor to Review-An-Impact, hosted by Brian Mann and Nate Milton.  The idea behind the show came from the viewer feedback segments from Review-an-Impact, where general questions regarding the co-hosts' opinions started to dominate the discourse as opposed to feedback related to episodes of the episodes of Impact Wrestling being reviewed.  With Live Audio Wrestling deciding to terminate coverage of TNA, it was agreed that the viewer feedback segment would effectively be expanded to cover the entire show.

The concept of this podcast, where the co-hosts must answer every question asked of them with absolute truth, was largely inspired by the segment of the same name on The Nightly Show with Larry Wilmore.  Similar to its predecessor, topics covered by the show are primarily focused on general wrestling news, diversity in professional wrestling, wrestling as it relates to pop culture, with a slight nod to politics.  The first episode aired on October 9, 2015.

Due to the hosts' other commitments, Keep It 100 aired for only seven weeks as a weekly series, though various special shows have been posted on an irregular basis, including those dedicated to covering TNA special events.

 Review-A-Merica "Review-A-Merica" was a one-off podcast covering the 2012 United States presidential election from the perspective of two Canadians (John and Wai).

In 2016, Brian and Nate revived the "Review-A-Merica" podcast for a series of shows covering the 2016 United States presidential election from a "wrestling with democracy" perspective.

 Ask-A-Wai Video Podcast 
The Ask-A-Wai name would later be reused for a video podcast series featuring John Pollock and Wai Ting in late 2011, as a complement to Review-A-Wai, where John Pollock and Wai Ting answered questions submitted by Review-A-Wai fans regarding pro wrestling and mixed martial arts. Though originally filmed in the "Review-A-Wai studios" at Fight Network, later entries were filmed in various locations in and around downtown Toronto.  A short-lived revival of Ask-A-Wai was also posted as a YouTube series on the Live Audio Wrestling YouTube channel in 2015, it ended in May 2016.

The Ask-A-Wai name would be used following the shutdown of the LAW, as a monthly audio podcast for Patreon supporters of Post Wrestling.

 CWCeen 
In 2016, a separate show, CWCeen, was added to the end of whtsNXT, covering the WWE Cruiserweight Classic.  This show was hosted by Braden Herrington and Wai Ting, and includes banter on their common love of hip-hop, as well as the fact that Braden Herrington had joined Fight Network after leaving TSN Radio.

End of Year Awards
Awards are given over the course of two episodes: the Best of episode, typically the last episode of the year under consideration or the first episode of the following year, and the Worst of episode, awarded the first week without a pay-per-view event after the Best of episode. Each host of the show nominates a pick in each category, and may also name "ties" and "honourable mentions" in each category.

Both Wai Ting and Braden Herrington have officially joined the other three hosts to hand out their Best of Awards & Worst of Awards. Ting in both 2012 and 2013, & Herrington in both 2014 and 2016.

Spinoff Series Awards
Additional Best & Worst of picks may also be given by other members of the LAW's associated podcasts, picks from these restricted in scope to the wrestling, but are otherwise identical in scope. As of January 2017 other LAW associated hosts include; ; ; ; ; ; ; ; ; & .

 To Be Added Soon'''
 Japanese Audio Wrestling: Year End Awards (2013-2016) The MMA Report with John Pollock: The Prediction Show'' w/ Ariel Helwani (2013-2017)

References

External links
Official Message Board of The LAW: Live Audio Wrestling

Canadian sports radio programs
Internet properties established in 1997
Mixed martial arts websites
Professional wrestling-related mass media
Wrestling Observer Newsletter
Syndicated Canadian radio programs